The men's aerials event in freestyle skiing at the 1994 Winter Olympics in Lillehammer took place from 21 to 24 February at Kanthaugen Freestyle Arena.

Results

Qualification
The top 12 advanced to the final.

Final

References

External links
- Sports-Reference - 1994 Men's aerials

Men's freestyle skiing at the 1994 Winter Olympics